Head First is the fifteenth studio album by English rock band Uriah Heep. It was released in 1983, on Gerry Bron's UK label Bronze Records, and would be their final album for the label.

The album was recorded by the line-up responsible for the previous year's Abominog, but this time with a greater proportion of the songs written by the band members.  Bob Daisley left the group shortly after the album's recording to rejoin Ozzy Osbourne; on the Head First tour former Heep bassist Trevor Bolder rejoined the band, effectively replacing his replacement, and remained with the band until his death in 2013.

Though Head First was deemed to be a worthy successor to Abominog by critics such as Geoff Barton, it suffered from a lack of promotion as Bronze went into liquidation the month after its release.

Video footage of the tour, from a show in New Zealand, was heavily featured on the long-form video Easy Livin': A History of Uriah Heep. In Japan only, this was also released on laserdisc.

Track listings

Personnel 
Uriah Heep
Mick Box – guitar, backing vocals
Lee Kerslake – drums
Bob Daisley – bass
John Sinclair – keyboards, synthesizer, backing vocals
Peter Goalby – vocals

Additional musicians
Frank Ricotti – percussion on "Roll-Overture"

Production
Ashley Howe – producer, engineer, mixing
Nick Rogers – engineer, mixing on "Roll-Overture"
Keith Nixon – assistant engineer

Singles 
"Stay on Top" was released as a single and a video was made. A double-7" gatefold edition was released. Non-album track "Playing for Time" was included.
"Lonely Nights", a cover version of the previous year's hit by Bryan Adams, was the second single. A picture-disc 7" was released.

Charts

Album

Singles

References

External links 
  The official Uriah Heep website

Uriah Heep (band) albums
1983 albums
Bronze Records albums
Mercury Records albums